Dieter Erler (28 May 1939 in Glauchau – 10 April 1998 in Chemnitz) was a German footballer.

He began his footballing career with BSG Chemie Glauchau in 1953. He was transferred to BSG Wismut Gera for the 1957 season and then after two seasons moved to sports club SC Wismut Karl-Marx-Stadt in January 1959. Erler was both a playmaker and a goalscoring midfielder.

In 1963, Erler moved to SC Karl-Marx-Stadt, where he played alongside the player described by Pelé as the best left-winger in the world at the time: Eberhard Vogel. In 1966–67 the team was crowned DDR-Oberliga champion.

Between 1959 and 1972 he played for SC Wismut Karl-Marx-Stadt and then FC Karl-Marx-Stadt. During his career he gained between 1959 and 1968 47 international caps and scored 12 goals for East Germany.

He was voted GDR footballer of the year in 1967.

Career statistics

Club

International

International goals
Scores and results list East Germany's goal tally first.

Honours

Club
SC Wismut Karl-Marx-Stadt
 DDR-Oberliga: 1959

Individual
 GDR Player of the Year: 1967

References

1939 births
1998 deaths
People from Glauchau
German footballers
East German footballers
East Germany international footballers
FC Erzgebirge Aue players
Chemnitzer FC players
Chemnitzer FC managers
East German football managers
DDR-Oberliga players
Association football midfielders
Footballers from Saxony